Andrea Cassone (April 29, 1929 – April 12, 2010) was the Catholic archbishop of the Archdiocese of Rossano-Cariati, Italy.

Ordained on December 22, 1951, Cassone was named archbishop on March 26, 1992, and was consecrated on May 9, 1992. Archbishop Cassone retired on May 6, 2006.

Notes

Roman Catholic archbishops in Italy
Bishops in Calabria
1929 births
2010 deaths